Ioana Gașpar-Ivan (born 17 April 1983) is a professional tennis player from Romania.

In May 2010, Ioana married her tennis coach, Mădălin Ivan, and changed her name to Gașpar-Ivan.
But her name is listed on both WTA and ITF sites as Ioana Gașpar.

On 17 September 2001, she reached her career-high singles ranking of world No. 258.

Junior Grand Slam finals

Doubles: 1 (title)

ITF finals

Singles: 9 (7 titles, 2 runner–ups)

Doubles: 28 (10 titles, 18 runner–ups)

References

External links
 
 
 

1983 births
Living people
Sportspeople from Timișoara
Romanian female tennis players
Wimbledon junior champions
Grand Slam (tennis) champions in girls' doubles